Berge Helle Kringlebotn (22 January 1904  –  19 August 1992) was a Norwegian politician for the Liberal Party.

He was born in Tune.

He was elected to the Norwegian Parliament from Aust-Agder in 1961, but was not re-elected in 1965.

Kringlebotn was involved in local politics in Flosta municipality council between 1937 and 1940, and in Søndeled between 1951 and 1959.

References

1904 births
1992 deaths
Liberal Party (Norway) politicians
Members of the Storting
20th-century Norwegian politicians